This is a list of botanists who have Wikipedia articles, in alphabetical order by surname. The List of botanists by author abbreviation is mostly a list of plant taxonomists because an author receives a standard abbreviation only when that author originates a new plant name.

Botany is one of the few sciences which can boast, since the Middle Ages, of a substantial participation by women.

A 

Erik Acharius
Julián Acuña Galé
Johann Friedrich Adam
Carl Adolph Agardh
Jacob Georg Agardh
Nikolaus Ager
William Aiton
Frédéric-Louis Allamand
Carlo Allioni
Lucile Allorge
Prospero Alpini
Benjamin Alvord
Adeline Ames
Eliza Frances Andrews
Agnes Arber
Giovanni Arcangeli
David Ashton
William Guybon Atherstone
Anna Atkins
Daniel E. Atha
Armen Takhtajan

B 

Ernest Brown Babcock
Churchill Babington
Curt Backeberg
James Eustace Bagnall
Jacob Whitman Bailey
Liberty Hyde Bailey
Ibn al-Baitar
Giovanni Battista Balbis
John Hutton Balfour
Joseph Banks
César Barbosa
Bryan Alwyn Barlow
Benjamin Smith Barton
John Bartram
William Bartram
Johann Bauhin
Gaspard Bauhin
Chauncey Beadle
William James Beal
Janice C. Beatley
Rolla Kent Beattie
Richard Henry Beddome
Martinus Beijerinck
David Bellamy
George Bentham
Robert Bentley
Miles Joseph Berkeley
Karl August von Bergen
Edward W. Berry
Clarence Bicknell
Jacob Bigelow
John Milton Bigelow
Gustaf Johan Billberg
Johannes Bisse
Francisco Manuel Blanco
John Bradby Blake
William Faris Blakely
Andrew Bloxam
Carl Ludwig Blume
Tyge W. Böcher
Hieronymus Bock
Herman Boerhaave
Wenceslas Bojer
Henry Nicholas Bolander
Harry Bolus
August Gustav Heinrich von Bongard
Charles Bonnet
Aimé Bonpland
Francis Boott
Evelyn Booth (1897–1988)
Attila Borhidi
Antonina Georgievna Borissova
Frederik Børgesen
David Bowman
Richard Bradley
Alexander Braun
John Patrick Micklethwait Brenan
William Henry Brewer
Charles-François Brisseau de Mirbel
Elizabeth Gertrude Britton
Nathaniel Lord Britton
Adolphe Theodore Brongniart
Nicholas Edward Brown
Robert Brown
Patrick Browne
Jeremy James Bruhl
Louis-Ovide Brunet
Francis Buchanan-Hamilton
Alexander von Bunge
Elsa Beata Bunge
Luther Burbank
Frederick William Burbidge
William John Burchell
Alan Burges
David Burke
Joseph Burke II
Johannes Burman
Nicolaas Laurens Burman
Elizaveta Aleksandrovna Busch

C

Cleofé Caldéron
Albert Callay
George Caley
Ella Orr Campbell
Rudolf Jakob Camerarius
Rudolf Jakob Camerarius
Aimée Antoinette Camus
Augustin Pyramus de Candolle (A. P. de Candolle)
Alphonse Pyrame de Candolle (A. de Candolle)
Richard Émile Augustin de Candolle (Aug. de Candolle)
J. F. M. Cannon
Sherwin Carlquist
Cedric Errol Carr
Elie-Abel Carrière
George Washington Carver
William Casson
Antonio José Cavanilles
Andrea Cesalpino
Adelbert von Chamisso
Daniel Chamovitz
Pierre Gaspard Chaumette
Henry Chesterton
Carl Christensen
Arthur Roy Clapham
Lynn G. Clark
Adrienne Clarke
Gertrude Clarke Nuttall
Jens Clausen
Jane Colden
Runar Collander
Peter Collinson
Charles Coltman-Rogers
Philibert Commerçon
Joseph Whipple Congdon
Valerius Cordus
Giacomo Antonio Cortuso
Arthur Disbrowe Cotton
Arthur Cronquist
José Cuatrecasas
Nicholas Culpeper
Francesco Cupani
Charles Curtis
William Curtis

D

Anders Dahl
Antoine-Tristan Danty d'Isnard
John M. Darby
Frederick Hamilton Davey
Armand David
Walter Davis
Anton de Bary
Ethel de Fraine (1879–1918)
Pierre Jean Marie Delavay
Jules Paul Benjamin Delessert
René Louiche Desfontaines
Johann Jacob Dillenius
Kurt Dinter
Pedanius Dioscorides
Kingsley Dixon
Rembert Dodoens
David Don
James Donn
Catharina Helena Dörrien
David Douglas
John Dransfield
Robert Louis Dressler
Jonas C. Dryander
Heber Drury
Antoine Nicolas Duchesne
William Russell Dudley
Michel Felix Dunal
Ursula Katherine Duncan
Stephen Troyte Dunn
Robert Allen Dyer

E 

Michael Pakenham Edgeworth
Henrik Franz Alexander von Eggers
Christian Gottfried Ehrenberg
Jakob Friedrich Ehrhart
Eva Ekeblad
Stephan Ladislaus Endlicher
George Engelmann
Adolf Engler
Katherine Esau
Johann Friedrich von Eschscholtz
Constantin von Ettingshausen
Eleonora Gabrielian

F 

David Fairchild
Hugh Falconer
Reginald Farrer
Lewis J. Feldman
Luigi Fenaroli
Merritt Lyndon Fernald
Friedrich Ernst Ludwig von Fischer
Pius Font i Quer
Peter Forsskål
Georg Forster
Johann Reinhold Forster
Robert Fortune
Henry Georges Fourcade
Adrien René Franchet
William D. Francis
John C. Frémont
Elias Magnus Fries
Imre Frivaldszky
Charles Christopher Frost
Leonhart Fuchs

G 

Joseph Gaertner
François Gagnepain
Ernest Edward Galpin
George Alexander Gammie
James Alexander Gammie
Charles Gaudichaud-Beaupré
Alwyn Howard Gentry
Howard Scott Gentry
John Gerard
Conrad von Gesner
Luca Ghini
Ken Gillanders
Charles Henry Gimingham
Johann Friedrich Gmelin
Johann Georg Gmelin
Samuel Gottlieb Gmelin
Hossein Gol-e-Golab
George Gordon
Asa Gray
Netta Elizabeth Gray
Nehemiah Grew
William Griffith
Jan Frederik Gronovius
Wilhelm Gueinzius
Hugo Gunckel Lüer
Johann Ernst Gunnerus
Francis Guthrie
Guranda Gvaladze

H 

Ingebrigt Severin Hagen
Olaf Hagerup
Hiroshi Hara
Thora Hardy
Inez M. Haring
Robert Almer Harper
Karl Theodor Hartweg
William Henry Harvey
Adrian Hardy Haworth
John Stevens Henslow
Augustine Henry
Vernon Heywood
Mary MacLean Hindmarsh
Adriana Hoffmann
Johann Centurius Hoffmannsegg
Henrietta Hooker
Joseph Dalton Hooker
William Jackson Hooker
Josiah Hoopes
Albert Howard
Gabrielle Howard
Armando Theodoro Hunziker
John Hutchinson

I 
Agnes Ibbetson
Jane Ingham
Keisuke Ito

J 

Vello Jaaska (born 1936)
Vilve Jaaska (fl. 1990)
Victor Jacquemont
Nikolaus Joseph von Jacquin
Joseph Franz von Jacquin
Knud Jessen
Wilhelm Johannsen
Lawrence Alexander Sidney Johnson
Ivan Murray Johnston
Adrien-Henri de Jussieu
Antoine Laurent de Jussieu
Antoine de Jussieu
Bernard de Jussieu

K 

Kaibara Ekiken
Guillermo Kalbreyer
Pehr Kalm
Gustav Karl Wilhelm Hermann Karsten
Kailas Nath Kaul
Sir Frederick Keeble
Albert Kellogg
George Clayton Kennedy
Alice L. Kibbe
Franz Kiggelaer
Kanhoba Ranchoddas Kirtikar
Masao Kitagawa
Karl Koch

L 

Jacques Labillardière
Dorothy van Dyke Leake
Lars Levi Laestadius
Jean-Baptiste Lamarck
Aylmer Bourke Lambert
Jean Vincent Félix Lamouroux
Gerhard Lang (1924–2016)
Kai Larsen
Joseph Bory Latour-Marliac
Charles de l'Écluse
Jean Baptiste Leschenault de la Tour
Emmanuel Liais
John Lindley
Johann Heinrich Friedrich Link
Carlos Adolfo Lehnebach
Carl Linnaeus
Carolus Linnaeus the Younger
William Richardson Linton
Pablo de la Llave
Thomas Lobb
William Lobb
George Loddiges
Harri Lorenzi
A.S. Losina-Losinskaja
John Claudius Loudon
Alice Lounsberry
Elias Lönnrot

M 

Elizabeth McClintock
William McCalla
John Macoun
Peter MacOwan
Aime Mäemets
Pierre Magnol
Joseph Maiden
Marcello Malpighi
Gustav Mann
Charles Maries
Jesse Jarue Mark
Rudolf Marloth
Humphry Marshall
Austin Mast
Carl Friedrich Philipp von Martius
John M. MacDougal
Terry Desmond Macfarlane
William Keble Martin
John Martyn
Genkei Masamune
Francis Masson
Carl Maximowicz
Rogers McVaugh
Gregor Mendel
Friedrich Kasimir Medikus
Archibald Menzies
Konstantin Merezhkovsky
Franz Meyen
André Michaux
Philip Miller
Charles Frederick Millspaugh
Friedrich Anton Wilhelm Miquel
Charles-François Brisseau de Mirbel
John Mitchell
Hugo von Mohl
Charles Theodore Mohr
Paul Möhring
George Thomas Moore
Robert Morison
Osborne Morton
Józef Motyka
Cornelius Herman Muller
Ferdinand von Mueller
Otto von Münchhausen

N 

Karl Wilhelm von Nageli
P. K. K. Nair
George Valentine Nash
Christian Gottfried Daniel Nees von Esenbeck
Charles F. Newcombe
Frank Newhook
Louis Nicolas
Daniel Lee Nickrent
Emilia Frances Noel
Thomas Nuttall

O 

William Oakes (botanist)
Daniel Oliver
Garcia de Orta
Carl Hansen Ostenfeld

P 

William Hunt Painter
Peter Simon Pallas
Edward Palmer
Josif Pancic
Filippo Parlatore
Charles Christopher Parry
William Paterson
Ruth Patrick
Ove Paulsen
Richard Pearce
Donald C. Peattie
Jean-Marie Pelt
Herman Silas Pepoon
Karl Julius Perleb
Henri Perrier de la Bâthie
Christian Hendrik Persoon
Paul Petard
James Petiver
Hans Heinrich Pfeiffer
Rodolfo Amando Philippi
Louis Alexandre Henri Joseph Piré
Pliny the Elder
Leonard Plukenet
Charles Plumier
Eduard Friedrich Poeppig
Joel Roberts Poinsett
Illtyd Buller Pole-Evans
Alf Erling Porsild
Morten Pedersen Porsild
Thomas Conrad Porter
Eduard Pospichal
George E. Post
Ghillean Prance 
Ludwig Preiss
Jan Svatopluk Presl
Carl Borivoj Presl
Joseph Hubert Priestley
Cyrus Pringle
Nathanael Pringsheim
George R. Proctor
Michael Proctor
William Purdom
Frederick Traugott Pursh
Paul Émile de Puydt
Henri François Pittier

Q 
Agnes J. Quirk

R 

Gabriele Rabel
Oliver Rackham
Albert Ernest Radford
Constantine Samuel Rafinesque
 John Ralfs
Christen C. Raunkiær
Leonhard Rauwolf
Peter H. Raven
John Ray
Anton Rehmann
Gustaf Otto Rosenberg
Heinrich Gustav Reichenbach
Ludwig Reichenbach
Jose Restrepo
Thekla Resvoll
Hanna Resvoll-Holmsen
Achille Richard
Louis Claude Richard
Henry Nicholas Ridley
Augustus Quirinus Rivinus
Harold E. Robinson
Frans Hubert Edouard Arthur Walter Robyns
Joseph Rock
Tony Rodd
Lauritz Kolderup Rosenvinge
Werner Rothmaler
William Roxburgh
Georg Eberhard Rumphius
Per Axel Rydberg

S 

Joseph Sabine
Julius von Sachs
Thiodolf Saelan
Augustin Saint-Hilaire
Edward James Salisbury
Richard Anthony Salisbury
Richard Sanders Rogers
Charles Sprague Sargent
Henry Parker Sartwell
William Saunders
Horace-Bénédict de Saussure
Andreas Franz Wilhelm Schimper
Diederich Franz Leonhard von Schlechtendal
Rudolf Schlechter
Matthias Jakob Schleiden
George Schoener
Selmar Schonland
Heinrich Wilhelm Schott
Franz Paula von Schrank
Georg August Schweinfurth
Giovanni Antonio Scopoli
Berthold Carl Seemann
Prideaux John Selby
Jean Senebier
Martín Sessé y Lacasta
John Adolph Shafer
George Shaw
Shen Kuo
John Sibthorp
Franz Sieber
Philipp Franz von Siebold
Thomas Robertson Sim
Cuthbert John Skead
John Kunkel Small
Mikhail Nikolaevich Smirnov
Christo Albertyn Smith
Edith Philip Smith
James Edward Smith
Johannes Jacobus Smith
Winifred Smith
Daniel Solander
Otto Wilhelm Sonder
Pierre Sonnerat
Roger David Spencer
Herman Spoering
Kurt Sprengel
Richard Spruce
Herman Spöring
Clive Stace
Agustín Stahl
Paul Carpenter Standley
G. Ledyard Stebbins
Berthold Stein
Georg Wilhelm Steller
Kaspar Maria von Sternberg
Julian Alfred Steyermark
Eduard Strasburger
George Bishop Sudworth
Su Song
Olof Swartz
Simon Syrenius

T 

Hisayoshi Takeda (aka Takeda Hisayoshi)
Armen Takhtajan
Arthur Tansley
John Templeton
Theophrastus
William Turner Thiselton-Dyer
Graham Stuart Thomas
William Thompson
George Thomson
Robert Folger Thorne
Louis-Marie Aubert du Petit-Thouars
Carl Peter Thunberg
Agostino Todaro
John Torrey
Joseph Pitton de Tournefort
John Tradescant the elder
John Tradescant the younger
Ernst Rudolf von Trautvetter
Mikhail Tsvet
Edward Tuckerman
William Turner
Tom Tutin

U 

Bernardino da Ucria
Lucien Marcus Underwood
Ignatz Urban

V 

Martin Vahl
Sébastien Vaillant
David H. Valentine
Elizabeth Van Volkenburgh
Domenico Vandelli
Nikolai Vavilov
Harry Veitch
John Gould Veitch
Peter Veitch
Ina Vandebroek
Romina Vidal-Russell

W 

Warren H. Wagner
Göran Wahlenberg
George Arnott Walker-Arnott
Nathaniel Wallich
Gustav Wallis
E. F. Warburg
Eugenius Warming
Sereno Watson
William Watson
Heinrich Wawra von Fernsee
Randy Wayne (biologist)
Philip Barker Webb
Christian Ehrenfried Weigel
Friedrich Welwitsch
George Stephen West
William West
William West Jr
Lilly Wigg
Carl Ludwig Willdenow
Ernest Henry Wilson
William Withering
Anthony Hurt Wolley-Dod
Alphonso Wood
John Medley Wood
Charles Wright
Franz Xavier von Wulfen
Heinrich Wullschlägel
Heinrich Wydler
 Ben-Erik van Wyk

Y 
Gennady Yakovlev

Z 

Karl Ludwig Philipp Zeyher
Daniel Zohary
Michael Zohary
Scott Zona
Joseph Gerhard Zuccarini
Joy Zedler

See also

 List of women botanists
 List of botanists by author abbreviation 
 List of authors of South African botanical taxa 
 List of gardener-botanist explorers of the Enlightenment
 List of Hungarian botanists
 List of Russian biologists
 List of Slovenian botanists